Jean Clarence Bourque (March 28, 1918 – September 11, 2008) was a Canadian politician. He served in the Legislative Assembly of New Brunswick as member of the Liberal party from 1948 to 1952.

References

1918 births
2008 deaths
20th-century Canadian legislators
20th-century Canadian physicians
New Brunswick Liberal Association MLAs
People from Edmundston